Guigues VIII de la Tour-du-Pin (1309 – 28 July 1333) was the Dauphin of Vienne from 1318 to his death. He was the eldest son of the Dauphin John II and Beatrice of Hungary.

Career
Only nine years of age when his father died, he succeeded under the regency of his uncle Henri Dauphin, the bishop-elect of Metz, which was exercised until 1323.

Knight and combatant par excellence, in 1325, at the age of sixteen, he won the Battle of Varey, near Pont d'Ain, in a brilliant battle against the Savoyards. Contemporary chronicles say that "l'ost de Savoye fut bellement desconfit." From that date to his death, Guigues was in constant conflict with his Savoyard neighbours.

French influence was reinforced during his reign, especially by his marriage to Isabelle, daughter of Philip V of France. In 1328, at the Battle of Cassel, Philip VI entrusted to Guigues the command of the Seventh Corps, with its twelve banners.  In the battle the Flemish burgers were smashed by the French chivalry. For his courage, Guigues was rewarded with the Maison aux Piliers in Grève, Paris.

Guigues was killed while besieging the Savoyard castle of La Perrière in 1333.  He left the Dauphiné to his brother Humbert II. He was buried in Saint-André in Grenoble.

Notes

Sources

1309 births
1333 deaths
14th-century peers of France
Dauphins of Viennois
French military personnel killed in action